Sir Andreas Whittam Smith,  (born 13 June 1937) is an English financial journalist, who was one of the founders of The Independent newspaper, which began publication in October 1986 with Whittam Smith as editor. He is a former president of the British Board of Film Classification.

Early life and education
Whittam Smith was born in Macclesfield, son of Rev. Canon J. E. Smith, a vicar at Macclesfield; the family moved to Birkenhead in 1940 when his father took over a dockland parish. J. E. Smith was from a working-class family from Manchester, going from there to St John's College, Durham; his wife was daughter of a mill owner. Smith was educated at Birkenhead School, and Keble College, Oxford.

Career
Most of his career has been spent in the city in journalism, including as city editor of The Guardian and The Daily Telegraph, and as editor of the Investors Chronicle from 1970 to 1977, and Stock Exchange Gazette. With Matthew Symonds, he was a co-founder of The Independent newspaper and was its first editor from 1986 to 1993. He still contributes articles on a regular basis.

Whittam Smith was chairman of the Financial Ombudsman Service from 2001 to 2003. He is also a director of Independent News and Media (UK), Vice Chairman of Tunbridge Wells Equitable Friendly Society, and a vice-president of the National Council for One Parent Families. He was appointed president of the British Board of Film Classification in 1998, instigating liberalisation of film and video censorship, a post from which he resigned in 2002. He has been on the Board of Trustees of The Architecture Foundation.

Whittam Smith was interviewed by National Life Stories (C467/08) in 2007 for the 'Oral History of the British Press' collection held by the British Library.

Church of England
On 6 March 2002, Whittam Smith was appointed the First Church Estates Commissioner, a senior lay person in the Church of England. As such, he is Chairman of the Church Commissioners' Assets Committee (an investment portfolio of £7 billion), and a member of the Church Commissioners' Board of Governors, the General Synod of the Church of England, and the Archbishops' Council. It was announced in September 2016 that he would be stepping down as First Church Estates Commissioner in June 2017.

Democracy 2015
In 2012 Whittam Smith started the Democracy 2015 movement to attempt to reform how British democracy functions. The movement's stated aim was to achieve a House of Commons majority in 2015 and form a reformist government independent of parliamentary parties and composed of non-politicians volunteering to stand for a single term only. The movement said that politics should be public service, not a career move. The movement stood a candidate, Adam Lotun, in the Corby by-election on 15 November 2012. He came 13th out of 14 candidates, with 35 votes.

Honours
In 1988 Whittam Smith was awarded the Honorary Degree of Doctor of Laws (LL.D) by the University of Bath.

In the 2003 New Year Honours, he was made a Commander of the Order of the British Empire (CBE) "for services to the Film Industry." In the 2015 Birthday Honours, he was knighted "for public service, particularly to the Church of England", and therefore granted the title "Sir".

In July 2017, he was awarded the Canterbury Cross for Services to the Church of England by the Archbishop of Canterbury, Justin Welby.

References

External links
Democracy 2015

1937 births
Alumni of Keble College, Oxford
British male journalists
Commanders of the Order of the British Empire
English Anglicans
Living people
People educated at Birkenhead School
People from Birkenhead
The Independent founders
Knights Bachelor
Church Estates Commissioners
The Independent editors
British republicans